"Heads You WinTails I Lose" is a song written by Brian Wilson and Gary Usher for the American rock band The Beach Boys. It was released on their 1962 album Surfin' Safari.

Composition
According to lyricist Gary Usher, "Heads You WinTails I Lose" resulted from an effort to turn contemporary expressions into songs. The song is in AABA form. In the A sections, the typical doo-wop chord patterns are split in half, and then repeated: I-vi-I-vi-IV-V-IV-V. The B section is a more traditional pattern, much like other songs from Surfin' Safari

Recording
"Heads You WinTails I Lose" was recorded at the last Surfin' Safari session, on September 6, 1962. While Nik Venet is officially credited as producer, some of the participants claim that Brian Wilson did the production work.

Personnel
The Beach Boys
Mike Love  lead vocals
David Marks  rhythm guitar
Brian Wilson  harmony and backing vocals; bass guitar
Carl Wilson  harmony and backing vocals; lead guitar
Dennis Wilson  harmony and backing vocals; drums

References

1962 songs
The Beach Boys songs
Songs written by Gary Usher
Songs written by Brian Wilson
Song recordings produced by Nick Venet